The Minnesota Golden Gophers women's ice hockey program represented the University  of Minnesota during the 2013–14 NCAA Division I women's ice hockey season. Their senior class featured Bethany Brausen, Sarah Davis, Baylee Gillanders and Kelly Terry, compiling a record of 139-17-5. Hannah Brandt, Rachel Bona and Sarah Davis would each reach the 100 point career mark. 
The Golden Gophers logged the best attendance in NCAA women’s hockey with 84,672 fans while setting an NCAA women’s hockey record with a power play of 32.7 percent. In addition, the Golden Gophers would qualify for the NCAA tournament for the tenth time in program history.
In the postseason, the Golden Gophers were defeated 2-1 in overtime by the RIT Tigers during the WCHA championship tournament. In the quarterfinals, the Golden Gophers defeated Cornell by a 3–2 mark on home ice. Advancing to the Frozen Four championship game in Hamden, Connecticut, the Golden Gophers were bested by the Clarkson Golden Knights.

Offseason

Recruiting

Exhibition

News and notes
November 2, 2013: In a 7-0 road win against Minnesota State, Sarah Davis earned an assist for the 100 point of her career. 
November 16, 2013: Competing against the North Dakota Fighting Sioux, Hannah Brandt logged an assist for career point 100. 
November 17, 2013: A 3-2 loss suffered at the hands of the North Dakota Fighting Sioux snapped the Golden Gophers NCAA record winning streak at 62 victories. The streak began on February 18, 2012. 
November 23, 2013: A 5-1 victory against the Yale Bulldogs provided head coach Brad Frost with the 200th win of his coaching career. 
January 17, 2014: The Golden Gophers hosted their first outdoor game in program history. Called the Hockey City Classic, the event was hosted at TCF Bank Stadium. Competing against the Minnesota State Mavericks, Sarah Davis compiled three points in a 4-0 triumph. In addition, freshman Jordyn Burns logged the first goal of her career.
January 31, 2014: On the road against North Dakota, the programs played in front of 5,835 fans, a UND program record.  Of note, the Golden Gophers would prevail by a 5-1 mark in Grand Forks. 
February 14, 2014: A 3-2 road win versus Wisconsin secured the WCHA regular season title for the Golden Gophers. The game winning tally was logged by freshman forward Dani Cameranesi. 
February 15, 2014: Once again competing against Wisconsin, the two programs set an NCAA women’s hockey attendance record by competing in front of 13,573 fans. 
February 15-22, 2014: Sophomore goaltender Amanda Leveille had a three-game shutout streak. 
February 28, 2014: Playing against St. Cloud State, Rachel Bona registered two assists in order to earn the 100 point of her career. 
A sixth WCHA Final Face-Off title was earned in a 3-1 win versus the North Dakota Fighting Sioux. 
In the NCAA Quarterfinals against Boston University, Kelly Terry scored a hat trick while Rachel Ramsey contributed three points (one goal, two assists) in a 5-1 victory.
Against rival Wisconsin in the NCAA Frozen Four, the squad scored three unanswered goals in the third period to overcome a 3-2 deficit. Goaltender Amanda Leveille compiled a career-best 34 saves in the effort. 
By losing in the NCAA championship game against the Clarkson Golden Knights, it snapped the program record of 50 consecutive wins away from Ridder Arena. In addition, the loss resulted in the program dropping to #2 in the national rankings. It snapped the mark of 46 consecutive times at #1 in USCHO.com polls and 50 straight on top of the USA Today/USA Hockey Magazine polls.

Postseason

WCHA

NCAA tournament

Awards and honors
Hannah Brandt, Finalist, 2014 Patty Kazmaier Memorial Award
Dani Cameranesi, WCHA Final Face-Off All-Tournament Team
Laura Halldorson, Inductee into University of Minnesota’s M Club Hall of Fame
Amanda Leveille, WCHA Final Face-Off All-Tournament Team
Rachel Ramsey, WCHA Final Face-Off Most Valuable Player
Kelly Terry, WCHA Final Face-Off All-Tournament Team

Golden Gophers at the Winter Games
 Gophers alumnae Mira Jalosuo and Noora Räty skated for Finland
 Team USA featured alumnae Megan Bozek, Gigi Marvin and Anne Schleper
 Current Gophers Amanda Kessel and Lee Stecklein were also named to Team USA

References

Minnesota
Minnesota Golden Gophers women's ice hockey seasons
NCAA women's ice hockey Frozen Four seasons
Minn
Minne
Minne